Plummer is an unincorporated community in Washington Township, Greene County, in the U.S. state of Indiana.

History
Plummer was likely named for Thomas Plummer, an early county official. A post office was established at Plummer in 1889, and remained in operation until it was discontinued in 1921.

Geography

References

Unincorporated communities in Greene County, Indiana
Unincorporated communities in Indiana